Donald R. Todd (October 10, 1941 — March 2, 2019) was an American football coach.  He was the defensive line coach and defensive coordinator for the University of Houston from 1972 to 1985.  He led the Cougars' "Mad Dog" defense to four top ten national ratings, while tutoring such talents as Lombardi Award winner Wilson Whitley and All-Americans Hosea Taylor, Leonard Mitchell and Guy Brown.  His defenses were instrumental in the Cougars' achieving national rankings and victories over both Maryland in the 1977 Cotton Bowl Classic and Nebraska in the 1980 Cotton Bowl Classic.

In 2012, Todd was inducted into the University of Houston Athletic Hall of Honor, making him the only assistant coach in school history to enter the Hall.

A native of Plains, Texas, Todd played his college football for Sammy Baugh at Hardin–Simmons University in Abilene, Texas, where he excelled on both sides of the line.

References

1941 births
2019 deaths
People from Yoakum County, Texas
Players of American football from Texas
Hardin–Simmons Cowboys football players
Coaches of American football from Texas
Houston Cougars football coaches